Innuendo is the fourteenth studio album by the British rock band Queen, released on 4 February 1991 by Parlophone in the United Kingdom and it is the band's first studio album to be released by Hollywood Records in the United States. Produced by David Richards and the band, it was the band's last album to be released in lead singer Freddie Mercury's lifetime, and their most recent one to be composed of entirely new material, save for The Cosmos Rocks by the Queen + Paul Rodgers collaboration. It reached the No. 1 spot on the UK album charts for two weeks, and also peaked at No. 1 in Italy, the Netherlands, Germany, and Switzerland, staying at No. 1 for three weeks, four weeks, six weeks, and eight weeks, respectively. It was the first Queen album to go Gold in the US upon its release since The Works in 1984.

The album was recorded between March 1989 and November 1990. In the spring of 1987, Mercury had been diagnosed with AIDS, although he kept his illness a secret from the public and denied numerous media reports that he was seriously ill. The band and producers were aiming for a November or December release date in order to catch the crucial Christmas market, but Mercury's declining health meant that the release of the album did not take place until February 1991. Stylistically, Innuendo is in some sense a return to Queen's roots, with its harder rock sound, complex musical composition (title track), psychedelic effects ("I'm Going Slightly Mad"), and strong vocals from Mercury ranging three octaves (F2-F5). Nine months after the album was released, Mercury died of AIDS-derived bronchopneumonia.

The album cover was designed by Queen and Richard Gray. The booklets and single covers from the album are by Grandville, or are inspired by his illustrations. Innuendo was voted the 94th greatest album of all time in a national 2006 BBC poll.

Background and recording

Queen released their thirteenth album, The Miracle, in May 1989, but unlike their previous albums, they did not conduct a live tour. Freddie Mercury conducted an interview with BBC Radio 1, where he said that he wanted to break from the "album – tour – album – tour" routine. He had privately been diagnosed as HIV positive in 1987, and was now diagnosed with AIDS, which was not yet publicised; however, rumours had been spreading since 1988 about Mercury's health and of the possibility that he had the disease, with speculation fuelled by a clear physical decline in his appearance, particularly weight loss. While he kept quiet due to his personal rule not to talk to the media, the other band members denied the rumours; at one point, band member Roger Taylor told reporters that "he is healthy and working". In February 1990, Queen won the Brit Award for Outstanding Contribution to British Music. While Mercury accepted the award for the band at the Dominion Theatre, Brian May spoke for the band. Mercury's increasingly gaunt appearance at the ceremony sparked further speculation from the public about his health, which persisted throughout 1990. The 1990 BRIT Awards would be Mercury's final public appearance.

Mercury did not speak publicly about his health, saying that he did not want to sell his music out of the people's sympathy. He was determined to continue working on music with Queen for as long as he could, saying that he would "keep working until I fucking drop". Mercury was persistently bothered by reporters at his London home, making it difficult for the band to record music. As a result, the band relocated to Mountain Studios in Montreux, where the safer and more peaceful atmosphere allowed the band to concentrate. Early in  recording, the band decided again that all work would be credited to Queen as a whole instead of to individual contributing members; May said that the decision made a significant impact in the recording process, while Taylor said that it helped eliminate much of the egotistical struggles that would normally cause bands to break up.

The album was released in the US under a new label, the Disney-owned Hollywood Records, in an effort to garner greater exposure there. Hollywood had also secured the rights to Queen's Elektra and Capitol back catalogs, and began reissuing albums early in 1991, marking Queen's 20th anniversary.

Songs

"Innuendo"

"Innuendo" began as a jam session in Switzerland amongst Brian May, Roger Taylor and John Deacon in spring 1989. Freddie Mercury was upstairs and heard them playing the beat, and turned it into a song, creating the melody and starting off the lyrics. From then on all four worked on polishing the track and Taylor took over the lyrics (which were written as a tribute to Led Zeppelin and their song "Kashmir"). The middle section, written by Mercury, was included later and it featured a synth-orchestra programmed by producer David Richards and a flamenco interlude played by Yes guitarist Steve Howe, who had come to visit them and was asked to play. "Innuendo" was released as a single in January 1991, debuting at No. 1 in the UK.

"I'm Going Slightly Mad"

"I'm Going Slightly Mad" was begun in Mercury's London house, after he had the idea of writing a song about madness, inspired by Noël Coward's camp one-liners. Most of the lyrics like "banana tree" or "one needle", came from both him and his friend Peter Straker, who stayed up all night in Mercury's kitchen, devising ever more outlandish lines. The music is Mercury's and is one of the earliest songs the band were working on in Montreux when Steve Howe came in.
The video that accompanied the song saw Mercury dressed in a costume suit with wild hair, white gloves, long pointing shoes and extremely heavy make up, filmed in black and white. Whilst Queen fans were thoroughly amused by the band in the video, in the documentary, Champions of the World, Taylor confessed, from the band's perspective, the video was marred by Mercury's appearance having to be camouflaged by costume and make-up, as Taylor admitted Mercury looked "pretty ill, at that point."

"Headlong"

"Headlong" was written by May at the studio they had in Switzerland. He recorded it for his debut solo album, Back to the Light, which he was making at the same time, but after hearing Mercury sing it, decided it worked better as a Queen song.

"I Can't Live with You"

"I Can't Live with You" was also written for May's solo album. He gave it to the band as well since Taylor, Deacon and Mercury were fond of the track. Drums were programmed on synth by May, and the keyboard-pads were added by the producer.
An alternative version of this song appeared on the 1997 compilation album Queen Rocks, billed as the "'97 Rocks Retake". It was said to be more along the lines of how May and Taylor originally wanted the track to sound, with a harder, guitar-driven rock edge. May has stated in an interview that most of the original demo is in the recording, making the song "impossible" to mix.

"Don't Try So Hard"
"Don't Try So Hard" came from Mercury. The intro "rain" is actually the pre-set sound of the Korg M1, which appears when it is switched on ("00: Universe").

"Ride the Wild Wind"

"Ride the Wild Wind" was composed by Taylor, who recorded a demo with his own vocals. The album version is sung by Mercury with Taylor on backing vocals. The song is a sort of sequel of Taylor's A Night at the Opera composition, "I'm in Love with My Car", which focused on Taylor's passion for cars and racing. This time, the song involved all of the other members, that gave life to a fast song with beating drums and rhythmic bass line, eerily note-for-note similar to The Smiths' "Shakespeare's Sister", which create the sensation of speed and engine's roar. In the mid-part, a May solo, which accentuates the sense of high velocity, and also gives the song a heavier sound. In some parts, a racing car can be heard.

"All God's People"
"All God's People" was co-written by Mercury and Mike Moran, initially as part of Mercury's Barcelona project under the title "Africa by Night". He'd asked May to play guitar, then one thing led to another and the entire band played. The keyboard parts were played by Moran. Similar to "Somebody to Love" from A Day at the Races, "All God's People" has a strong gospel influence.

"These Are the Days of Our Lives"

"These Are the Days of Our Lives" was written by Taylor. Keyboards were programmed by all band members in the studio, and conga percussion was recorded by David Richards. The music video for this song was Mercury's last appearance in a video medium, and with his knowing farewell look straight at the camera, Mercury whispers "I still love you" at the end of the song. By the time the video was made, it had become impossible to disguise that Mercury was seriously ill. The video was filmed in colour, but converted to black and white to minimise Mercury's frail appearance. At a later date, colour footage of the band making the video was released, revealing just how ill Mercury was at the time.

"Delilah"
"Delilah" is a song Mercury penned for his favourite female calico cat named Delilah. Although Mercury had about 11 cats, Delilah was special. May recorded his solo using a talk box. Taylor later admitted he is not fond of the song, stating "I hate 'Delilah'. That's just not me."

"The Hitman"
The fly-away rocker "The Hitman" was started by Mercury. The original version was apparently on keyboards and in a different key. May took Mercury's riff (not uncommon), changed the key and recorded a demo of the heavy version. Deacon then re-arranged the structure and they all filled the gaps in lyrics and recorded it. All of the backing vocals were done by May. The demo version is sung by May, with Mercury making spoken comments (like "Bite the bullet baby!").

"Bijou"

"Bijou" was an idea Mercury and May had of making a song "inside-out", having guitar doing the verses and the vocal doing the break. Mercury put the chords, title and lyrics, and the two of them worked on the guitar parts. Mercury sang the first line and then May transferred the melody to his Red Special. The song was finished without any input from Taylor or Deacon. May later credited Jeff Beck's 1989 song "Where Were You" as the inspiration for the arrangement of "Bijou."  The inspiration for the song itself is twofold, Brian May; “The vocal is a succinct and very precise little verse, a little gem, a "Bijou" - a jewel buried at the heart of the piece: hence the name of the song.”   “My Mum was given a budgie by a friend - it became a great companion for her after she lost my Dad. She called it "Bijou" and she would spend hours talking to it! ..It was her little Bijou.”   In 2008, Queen + Paul Rodgers performed this song in their shows of the Rock the Cosmos Tour by May playing the verse live and then having Mercury's studio vocals play while a screen showed footage from the band's Wembley concert in 1986, with the visuals put in sync with the tape.

"The Show Must Go On"

"The Show Must Go On" was written by May, based on a chord sequence he had been working on. May decided to use the sequence, and both he and Mercury decided the theme of the lyrics and wrote the first verse together. From then on May finished the lyrics, completed the vocal melody and wrote the bridge, inspired by Pachelbel's Canon. Some keys and ideas were suggested by the producer too. The song chronicles the effort of Mercury continuing to perform despite approaching the end of his life.
The song was initially not released as a single as part of promotion for the Innuendo album, but was released in October 1991 as the band launched their Greatest Hits II album. The video for the song featured a compilation of clips from all their videos since 1982, in support of the Greatest Hits II album. Due to Mercury's critical health at the time of its production, a fresh appearance by the band in a video was not possible. The track is a personal favourite of fellow British artist Elton John, who performed the song at the Freddie Mercury Tribute Concert with the remaining members of Queen, and Tony Iommi playing rhythm guitar. A different live version featuring John on vocals later appeared on Queen's Greatest Hits III album.

Singles
"Innuendo" was the lead single from the album in most countries, except for the US where "Headlong" was released to radio as a promo prior to the album's release. The single was released on 14 January 1991 in Europe and in March 1991 in the US as a promo single, becoming Queen's third UK No. 1 single. The song also achieved modest success in the US, charting at No. 17 on Billboards Mainstream Rock Tracks chart. Still, the length and style of the track limited its appeal, and it only spent one week at No. 1 in the UK and quickly slid down the chart, spending only six weeks in the top 75. (B-side on 7 inch release: "Bijou").

"I'm Going Slightly Mad" was released on 4 March 1991. The song reached No. 1 in Hong Kong and reached No. 22 on the UK charts. (B-side on 7 inch release: "The Hitman" in some countries, in others it was "Lost Opportunity", which was a non-album cut).

"Headlong" was released as a promotional single in January 1991 in the US and as a single on 13 May 1991 in the UK. It entered the UK charts at No. 14, and reached No. 3 on the US Billboard Mainstream Rock Tracks chart. (B-side on 12 inch release: "All God's People" in some countries, in others, "Lost Opportunity" and in a few, "The Hitman". The 12" and CD also feature "Mad the Swine").

"I Can't Live with You" was released as a promo single to radio stations in the US. This two-track promo single, completely remixed by Brian Malouf, uses slightly different lead vocal tracks by Mercury, louder and tighter harmony tracks, and reprogrammed synth drums, resulting in a much more punchy and "over the top" poppy version than included on the album. It reached No. 28 on the US Mainstream Rock Tracks chart.

"These Are the Days of Our Lives" was first released in the US on Mercury's birthday, 5 September 1991 on cassette and to radio. In the UK it was released in December 1991 following Mercury's death, as a double A-side with "Bohemian Rhapsody". The single was the UK's Christmas No. 1 of 1991.

"The Show Must Go On" was released on 14 October 1991 in the UK. The single was taken from the album but was released as promotion for the Greatest Hits II album (Classic Queen in the US/Canada), and peaked at No. 16 on the UK charts. After Mercury's death in November, the song re-entered the British charts and spent as many weeks in the top 75 as it had upon its original release. This single was released just six weeks before Mercury died. In 1992, the song was released as a double A-side with "Bohemian Rhapsody" in the US and reached No. 2 in the US. (The original B-side in October 1991 was "Keep Yourself Alive").

Critical reception

In 1991, Chuck Eddy of Rolling Stone wrote that Innuendo was "the group's most playful top-to-bottom pile since The Game" and "there's no getting around the new album's craft", which he suggested meant the band were "finally satisfied with their lot in life", but he added "Innuendo is so lightweight you'll forget it as soon as it's over — which, with this band, should go without saying anyway". However, in 2016, writing for the same publication, Ron Hart described it as "Queen's last masterpiece" and an album which "boldly confronted mortality," likening it to David Bowie's final album Blackstar.

People wrote "If this is cartoon rock and roll, at least it's good and brazenly cartoonish." The Orange County Register observed "Queen dispenses with any stylistic variations or flirtations with dance music and offers its basic sound: lots of Mercury vocal leaps, fuzzed-out May guitar, choral overdubs and a sense of orchestral importance mixed with straightforward hard rock", concluding that it was a "mixed bag". The LA Times wrote "Given the bombast and harsh assault of Queen's biggest hits, it's a shock to find that the heart of... Innuendo, is made of soft, sweet, sticky, sentimental goo", but added "The goo actually goes down well" and "Queen hasn't forgotten how to rock."

In a retrospective review, AllMusic wrote "Innuendo was a fitting way to end one of rock's most successful careers". For Classic Rock in 2016, Malcolm Dome ranked it as Queen's ninth greatest album, writing that "Innuendo had a lot of intelligent humour and pathos about it." He praised the title track's "brilliantly synthesised orchestrations" and added "Perhaps most poignant of all is the low key yet mesmerising 'These Are The Days Of Our Lives', which ended with Mercury’s whispered paean 'I still love you', which was moving in its simplicity." Dome concluded "The album summed up how Queen could draw people close, yet still keep them at a convenient distance."

Track listing
All tracks credited to Queen, except "All God's People" credited to Queen and Mike Moran. All lead vocals by Freddie Mercury.

Original release

 Due to the total length of the album, the tracks "I'm Going Slightly Mad", "These Are the Days of Our Lives", "Don't Try So Hard", "The Hitman" and "Bijou" had to be shortened in order to fit on the LP release. The track listing for the LP release is also slightly different from the one for the CD release, with "Don't Try So Hard" moved to side 2, between "Delilah" and "The Hitman". Some of the shortened tracks can be found on the B-sides of concurrent 12" singles.

2015 LP
Innuendo was re-released on vinyl on 25 September 2015 by Virgin EMI Records and Hollywood Records, alongside all of Queen's other studio albums. This was the first time the album had been presented on vinyl in full, spread across 2 LPs. Just as the original LP had an altered track listing, the 2 LP version swapped the placement of “I Can’t Live With You” and “These Are the Days of Our Lives” to have a more equal amount of time on each side of vinyl. 

Personnel
Track numbering refers to CD and digital releases of the album.Queen Freddie Mercury – lead vocals , backing vocals , keyboard , drum machine 
 Brian May – electric guitar , backing vocals , keyboards , drum machine , acoustic guitar , lead vocals 
 Roger Taylor – drums , backing vocals , percussion , keyboards , drum machine , additional vocals 
 John Deacon – bass , keyboards Additional personnel'
 Steve Howe – Spanish guitar 
 Mike Moran – keyboards 
 David Richards – producing, engineering, keyboard 
 Noel Harris – assistant engineer
 Justin Shirley-Smith – assistant engineer
 Richard Gray – sleeve design
 Grandville  – illustrations
 Angela Lumley – additional illustrations
 Simon Fowler – photography

Charts

Weekly charts

Year-end charts

Certifications

References

External links
 Queen official website: Discography: Innuendo: includes lyrics of all non-bonus tracks except "Headlong" and "I Can't Live with You".

1991 albums
Albums produced by David Richards (record producer)
Hollywood Records albums
Parlophone albums
Queen (band) albums